Jacques Marin (9 September 1919 – 10 January 2001) was a French actor on film and television. Marin's fluency in English and his instantly recognisable features made him a familiar face in some major American and British productions (Charade, The Train, Marathon Man) and Disney movies (The Island at the Top of the World and Herbie Goes to Monte Carlo).

Selected filmography

  (1947) as Un voyou
  (1948) as Barman (uncredited)
 Forbidden Games (1952) as Georges Dolle
 We Are All Murderers (1952) as Un gardien au bar (uncredited)
 Double or Quits (1953) as Lucien
 Before the Deluge (1954) as L'ouvrier à bicyclette (uncredited)
 J'y suis, j'y reste (1954) (uncredited)
 Faites-moi confiance (1954) as Bob (uncredited)
 Papa, Mama, the Maid and I (1954) as Gaston, un voisin
 Sur le banc (1954)
  (1955) as L'inspecteur
 French Cancan (1955) as Un spectateur (uncredited)
  (1955) as Le policier
 Men in White (1955)
 Les Évadés (1955) as Un prisonnier
 Papa, maman, ma femme et moi (1955) as Le garagiste (uncredited)
 Black Dossier (1955) as Un policier
 Gas-Oil (1955) as Un gendarme au commissariat
 L'Amant de lady Chatterley (1955) as Un habitué du pub
 If Paris Were Told to Us (1956) as Un gardien de prison (uncredited)
 People of No Importance (1956) as Armand - le routier qui fesse Clotilde
 Naughty Girl (1956) as Gendarme
 Mon curé chez les pauvres (1956) (uncredited)
 Marie Antoinette Queen of France (1956) as Crieur de journaux
  (1956) as L'automobiliste
 Le Sang à la tête (1956) as L'agent de police (uncredited)
 Paris, Palace Hotel (1956) as Le livreur de fleurs au Palace
 La Traversée de Paris (1956) as Le patron du restaurant Saint Martin
  (1957) (uncredited)
 Le rouge est mis (1957) as Un agent (uncredited)
 The Vintage (1957) as Cousin (uncredited)
 Le coin tranquille (1957) (uncredited) 
 Three Days to Live (1957) as Le gendarme
 Gates of Paris (1957) as Un inspecteur (uncredited)
 La Parisienne (1957) as Le policier motard (uncredited)
 La Tour, prends garde ! (1958) as Aristide Cornilion (uncredited)
 Les Misérables (1958) as Le messager
  (1958) as Le pêcheur
 The Lovers of Montparnasse (1958) as Le patron du café (uncredited)
 Le désordre et la nuit (1958) as Le garçon de café (uncredited)
 In Case of Adversity (1958) as Le réceptionniste de l'hôtel Trianon
 Young Sinners (1958) as Monsieur Félix
 The Roots of Heaven (1958) as Cerisot
 Le Miroir à deux faces (1958) as Un professeur - collègue de Pierre
  (1958) as Rouille
 Le Joueur (1958) as L'employé du casino qui cherche sous la table
 Guinguette (1959) as Albert
  (1959) as L'inspecteur
 Archimède le clochard (1959) as Mimile
  (1959) as Le contrôleur
  (1959) as Lesquet (uncredited)
 Maigret et l'Affaire Saint-Fiacre (1959) as Albert, le chauffeur
 Rue des prairies (1959) as M. Mauduis (uncredited)
  (1959)
  (1960) as Tropmann
  (1960)
 Au coeur de la ville (1960)
 Crack in the Mirror (1960) as Watchman
 The Enemy General (1960) as Marceau
 The Old Guard (1960) as Le gendarme au saut de chaîne de vélo (uncredited)
 Love and the Frenchwoman (1960) as Controller (segment "Mariage, Le")
  (1960) as Le boucher
 The Truth (1960) as Le conducteur du bus
 La pendule à Salomon (1961)
  (1961) as Gaspard, the grocer
 The President (1961) as Le chauffeur du car
 The Big Gamble (1961) as The Hotel Clerk
 Le cave se rebiffe (1961) as L'inspecteur Larpin - de la Brigade des Moeurs (uncredited)
 The Black Monocle (1961) as Trochu
 Tiara Tahiti (1962) as Desmoulins
 Portrait-robot (1962)
 Gigot (1962) as Jean
 The Gentleman from Epsom (1962) as Raoul
 Five Miles to Midnight (1962) (uncredited)
 Le glaive et la balance (1963) as Un gendarme (uncredited)
 Méfiez-vous, mesdames (1963) as L'inspecteur Lebrun
 Charade (1963) as Insp. Edouard Grandpierre
 Anatomy of a Marriage: My Days with Françoise (1964) (uncredited)
 The Train (1964) as Jacques
 Vacaciones para Ivette (1964) as Noel Bernard
 Umorismo in nero (1965) as segment 1 'La Bestiole'
 Les Bons Vivants (1965) as Le brocanteur déménageur (segment "Fermeture, La")
 Fantômas se déchaîne (1965) as L'agent de police ferroviaire
 Paris au mois d'août (1966) as Bouvreuil
 Lost Command (1966) as Mayor
 How To Steal a Million (1966) as Chief Guard
 The 25th Hour (1967) as The Soldier at Dobresco's
 The Oldest Profession (1967) as Un agent de police (segment "Aujourd'hui") (uncredited)
  (1968) as Un déménageur
 The Girl on a Motorcycle (1968) as Pump Attendant
 The Night of the Following Day (1968) as Bartender
 A Very Curious Girl (1969) as Félix Lechat
  (1969) as Fernand
 Tintin and the Temple of the Sun (1969) as Un des 7 savants (voice)
 Darling Lili (1970) as Major Duvalle
 Mourir d'aimer (1971) as Le correspondant
 Le Cinéma de papa (1971) as L'acteur jouant le chef de gare dans le film américain
 Le petit matin (1971) as Ladouhère
 Jo (1971) as Andrieux
 Le drapeau noir flotte sur la marmite (1971) as Antoine Simonet
 A Time for Loving (1972) as Chauffeur
 Shaft in Africa (1973) as Cusset
 Now Where Did the 7th Company Get to? (1973) as L'épicier
 S*P*Y*S (1974) as Lafayette
 Les murs ont des oreilles (1974) as Lucas, le jardinier
 Vos gueules, les mouettes ! (1974) as Le porte-bannière
 Impossible Is Not French (1974) as Dussautoy
 The Island at the Top of the World (1974) as Captain Brieux
 Opération Lady Marlène (1975) as Le bistrot
 Flic Story (1975) as Le patron de l'auberge à Saint-Rémy
 Catherine et Compagnie (1975) as Le patron de l'agence de location de voitures
 Bons Baisers de Hong Kong (1975) as Le gradé de la police
 L'Année sainte (1976) as Moreau, le gardien de prison
 Marathon Man (1976) as LeClerc
 The Smurfs and the Magic Flute (1976) as Schtroumpf-Fête (voice)
 Le Jour de gloire (1976) as Le bistrot
 Herbie Goes to Monte Carlo (1977) as Inspector Bouchet
 Le mille-pattes fait des claquettes (1977) as L'inspecteur de police
 L'horoscope (1978) as J.L. Beauché
 Who Is Killing the Great Chefs of Europe? (1978) as Massenet
 Général... nous voilà ! (1978) as Mac Goland
 Grandison (1979) as Hauswirt
 Les Fabuleuses Aventures du legendaire Baron de Munchausen (1979) as Hercule (voice)
 Ach du lieber Harry (1981) as Hochwürden Harry
  (1982) as Albert
 Le Secret des sélénites (1984) as Hercule (voice)
 A Star for Two (1991) as Raymond

External links

1919 births
2001 deaths
Male actors from Paris
French male film actors
French male television actors
French National Academy of Dramatic Arts alumni
20th-century French male actors